A hangover is an unpleasant physiological effect that often follows the extensive consumption of alcohol.

Hangover or Hungover may also refer to:

Film and television
The Hangover (film series), a trilogy of American comedy films
The Hangover, a 2009 film
The Hangover Part II, a 2011 film
The Hangover Part III, a 2013 film
 Hangover (2010 film), an Indian Bengali-language film
 Hangover (2014 film), an Indian Malayalam-language film
 "Hangover" (Sanctuary), an episode of Sanctuary

Music
 The Hangovers (band), a British indie music group formed in 1998
 The Hangovers, an a cappella group formed in 1968, and their eponymous 1970 album

Albums
 The Hangover (Funkoars album) (2008)
 The Hangover (Gilby Clarke album) (1997)
 The Hangover (Obie Trice album) (2015)

Songs
 "Hangover" (Taio Cruz song), 2011
 "Hangover" (Starboy Nathan song), 2011
 "Hangover" (Psy song), 2014
 "Hangover", a song by Max Webster from the album Max Webster, 1976
 "Hangover", a song by America from the album Alibi, 1980
 "Hangover", a song by Betty Boo from the album GRRR! It's Betty Boo, 1992
 "Hangover", a 1961 song by the Fabulous Flee-Rekkers
 "Hangover", a 1983 song by Serious Drinking
 "Hangover", a 2010 song by Jason White
 "Hungover", a song by Michelle Williams from the album Unexpected, 2008
 "Hungover", a song by Kesha from the album Animal, 2010
 "Hungover", a song by Cascada from the album Original Me, 2011

Other uses
A phenomenon in which a sports team that wins a championship performs poorly the following season, such as the Super Bowl hangover.